Rosa bridgesii is a species of rose known by the common names pygmy rose and Sierran dwarf rose. It is native to California, where it grows in the forests of the Sierra Nevada and surrounding mountains and foothills. It may also occur in Oregon.

This rose is sometimes treated as a variety of Rosa gymnocarpa.

Description
Rosa bridgesii is a small rhizomatous shrub growing 10 to 80 centimeters tall. The brown stem is covered in paired prickles. The leaves are each made up of a few hairy, glandular leaflets which are oval in shape and toothed. The leaflet at the end of the leaf is up to 3 centimeters long and has a flat tip.

The inflorescence is a solitary flower or cyme of up to 5 flowers. The flower has five glandular sepals and five pink petals each up to 1.5 centimeters long. At the center are many stamens and up to 20 pistils. The fruit is a rose hip up to a centimeter wide.

References

External links
Jepson Manual Treatment - Rosa bridgesii
Rosa bridgesii - Photo gallery

bridgesii
Flora of California
Flora of Oregon
Flora of the Sierra Nevada (United States)
Natural history of the California chaparral and woodlands
Flora without expected TNC conservation status